Folsom Europe, also known as Folsom Straßenfest (English: Folsom Street Fest), is an annual BDSM and leather subculture street fair held in September in Berlin, Germany since 2003.

History 
Folsom Europe was established in 2003, in order to bring to Europe the non-profit leather festival concept pioneered by the Folsom Street Fair in San Francisco, California. 

Today this is one of the biggest gay fetish event in Europe together with the Berlin Leder und Fetisch e.V. (or BLF, English: Berlin Leather and Fetish) hosted Easter in Berlin which is held every Easter holiday. The main area for the two fetish festivals is in Schöneberg. The Folsom Europe street festival is at Fuggerstrasse and Welserstrasse, close to Wittenbergplatz. 

Folsom Europe is also the backdrop for the annual German Titleholders' Conference, an event which brings together fetish titleholders from all over the world to meet and collect money for charitable organisations in Berlin. Fundraising is an important part of this fetish street party, as it is the only event in Europe where the nuns from the Order of the Sisters of Perpetual Indulgence stand at the gates to collect funds from visitors.

See also
Berlin Pride
Kreuzberg Pride (Berlin)
Lesbian and Gay City Festival (Berlin)

References

External links
CSD Berlin / Berlin Pride 
Folsom Europe

BDSM organizations
Erotic events
Leather events
LGBT BDSM
Street fairs
LGBT events in Berlin
Culture in Berlin
Annual events in Berlin